The Asia-Pacific Scout Region  is the divisional office of the World Scout Bureau of the World Organization of the Scout Movement, headquartered in Makati, Philippines, with satellite offices in Australia and Japan. The Asia-Pacific Region services Scouting in the land area of Asia south of Siberia and east of Central Asia, and the bulk of the Pacific Basin, with the exception of the Federated States of Micronesia, the Marshall Islands and Palau, which are under the Interamerican Region by way of the Aloha Council of the Boy Scouts of America.

The Asia-Pacific Scout Region has witnessed the births and rebirths of national Scout organizations since the region was founded in 1956. Starting with ten founding members, it grew to 27 member countries by 2016, out of which 25 are full-fledged members and two are associate members, encompassing 30 million Scouts. Eight of the 15 largest Scout associations in the world are in the Region. All the formerly communist states of Central Asia and the Soviet Union have developed or are developing Scouting in the wake of the renaissance in the region. For several years, communism repressed Scouting in Afghanistan, where it has newly returned, as well as in Mongolia, which had been the first Soviet satellite state since 1924. On the other hand, the World Scout Committee accepted in 2009 the declaration of Gerakan Pramuka Indonesia of having 17 million members for the census 2008. This has directly affected and changed the membership figure in the region, resulting in an increase of 9 million members, which now stands at a total of 24.7 million in 2009.

Widely separated by uneven resources, cultures, ethnic groups and technological resources, Scouting in the Asia-Pacific Region generally enjoys the respect of the public and by governments, a wide array of volunteers encompassing public and private sectors, and is powered by a small but committed group of professionals in the Scouting service.

The current Regional Chairman is Dale Corvera, serving the terms 2002–2028 while the current Regional Director is Jose Rizal Pangilinan. Both are from the Philippines. Corvera was elected by fellow Committee members to serve as chair following elections for the APR Regional Scout Committee held 16 Feb 2022. He replaced the outgoing Regional Director His Excellency, Ambassador Ahmad Rusdi of Indonesia. (On 11 May 2022, the Philippines Caraga Region Commission of Election proclaimed Dale Corvera, who ran as representatives in the second legislative districts of Agusan del Norte, winner). His tenure ends in 2024 and the Asia-Pacific Region Scout Committee will re-elect a new chair.

This region is the counterpart of the Asia Pacific Region of the World Association of Girl Guides and Girl Scouts (WAGGGS).

Members
Associate Members of the Asia-Pacific Scout Region include The Scout Association of Macau and the Conseil du Scoutisme polynésien.

Potential member countries include:

 Nauru
 Samoa

 Tonga
 Tuvalu
 Vanuatu

The Asia-Pacific Region contains two of four countries with no Scouting organization, each of which are due to political constraints within the countries.
North Korea
Laos

The Asia-Pacific Silver Jubilee Celebration was held at the regional gathering at the 27th World Scout Conference in Denmark.

APRinbox is the monthly e-newsletter of World Scout Bureau/Asia Pacific Region circulated to Scouts and adult leaders in the global community of the Scout Movement, edited by the Asia Pacific Regional Office in Manila, Philippines.

The Suncheon Asia-Pacific Scout Centre (SAPSC) offers programs in English based on the Scout method of "learning by doing" – a hands-on experiential learning process in the outdoors through young leaders from the National Scout Organizations.

Scout Committee and subcommittees
The APR Scout Committee shall consist of ten persons from member National Scout Organizations in the Asia-Pacific Region who shall be elected by the conference by secret ballot for a term of six years. The chairman of the committee is the leader of the region, which is elected between the committee members. The current chairperson is H.E. Ahmad Rusdi from Indonesia. One of its main functions is to act on behalf of the conference between its meetings and to appoint subcommittees or study committees as may be needed. There are six subcommittees from 2015 to 2018, which are: Programme, Adult Support, Management, Financial Resources, Scouting Profile and Foundation Management. All the members are nominated from the member NSOs, with the youth representatives, Regional Youth Representatives, who are elected from the Asia-Pacific Regional Youth Forum.

Current Asia-Pacific Region Scout Committee members

Previous Asia-Pacific Regional Scout Committee members

Regional Conference and Summit

The APR Scout Conference are held every three years as to gather all the NSOs to deal with the major regional problem. It is the toppest governing body of the region. 22 APR Scout Conference was held in Japan in 2007. The 23rd Asia-Pacific Regional Scout Conference held from 27 October to 1 November 2009, in Kuala Lumpur, Malaysia had 440 participants from Asia-Pacific, Africa, Arab, Interamerica, Europe, Eurasia and other organizations. The APR Scout Committee and Sub-committees members are also elected by the conference. The next conference will be held in Bangladesh in 2012. Between Conferences there are APR Scout Leaders' Summit. The last Summit was held in India in 2010.

Regional Youth Forum

Fifty-seven participants from 17 countries attended the 2004 Asia-Pacific Region Youth Forum in Brunei Darussalam in December 2004. Six Youth advisors were elected and attended the Regional Committee meetings.  The Youth Advisers are Edward Cook, Chairman (New Zealand), Eko Andrianto of Indonesia, Netsai Khaimarn of Thailand, In Sun Ryu of Korea, Maiya Twayanabasu of Nepal, and Aaron Wardle (Australia). They advised on helping to organize and manage the next youth forum.

107 participants from 24 countries attended the 6th Asia-Pacific Region Youth Forum in Kuala Lumpur, Malaysia in October 2009. Seven Young Adult Member Group members were elected and they are assigned to the Regional Committee or Sub-committee. The Young Adult Member Group members are Maeedh Mohamed Zahir of Maldives as the new chairman, Lam Kwok Hei Dicky of Hong Kong, Ari Wijanarko Adipratomo of Indonesia, Seo Ji Eun of Korea, Mohd Hafiz Bin Ariffin of Malaysia, Oliver Lim Zi Kai of Singapore and Krittee Tantivisitkul of Thailand. They advised on helping to organise and manage the next youth forum in Bangladesh in 2012.

Award for Outstanding Scouts

The project calls for the selection of Outstanding Scouts in the Asia-Pacific Region from among candidates nominated by member NSOs in the region, and the award is to be made at the Asia-Pacific Regional Conferences which are held every three years. This contest started eight years ago at the regional conference in Delhi in 2001, and has become a regular feature of every regional conference. The main purpose of the contest is to enhance the image and visibility of Scouting as an educational movement, and to emphasize its effectiveness in the development of young people at home, in school, and in communities. 5 finalists are invited to attend the Asia-Pacific Regional Conference to be interviewed by a board of judges from among appropriate persons (usually committee members from the Programme Sub-Committee and the Scouting Profile Sub-Committee).

Regional Rover Moot

For older Scouts (traditionally called Rovers or Rover Scouts), the Region has sponsored region-wide Rover Moots. It has not been held already in the Region.

Past Moots include:
 1st Asia-Pacific (7th Australian) Rover Moot – Yabamac, Victoria – December 1977 – January 1978
 2nd Asia-Pacific (8th Australian) Rover Moot – BP Park, Samford, Queensland – December 1980 – January 1981
 3rd Asia-Pacific (4th Republic of China (Taiwan)) Rover Moot – Yangmingshan, Taipei City Republic of China (Taiwan) – 1982
 4th Asia-Pacific (9th Australian) Rover Moot – Gowrie Park, Tasmania, Australia – December 1983 – January 1984
 5th Asia-Pacific Rover Moot – Christchurch, New Zealand – 1984
 6th Asia-Pacific (11th Australian) Rover Moot – Camp Cotter, Canberra Australian Capital Territory, Australia – December 1989 – January 1990
 7th Asia-Pacific (12th Australian) Rover Moot – Woodman Point, Perth, Western Australia, Australia – December 1992 – January 1993
 8th Asia-Pacific (13th Australian) Rover Moot – Cataract Scout Park, Sydney New South Wales, Australia – December 1995 – January 1996
 9th Asia-Pacific Rover Moot – Bangladesh – 1997
 10th Asia-Pacific (14th Australian) Rover Moot – Yea, Victoria, Australia – December 1998 – January 1999
 11th Asia-Pacific (1st Mongolian) Rover Moot – Mongolia – 1999
 12th Asia-Pacific (15th Australian) Rover Moot – Landsborough, Queensland, Australia – December 2001 – January 2002
 13th Asia-Pacific (21st Australian) CBR Rover Moot – Canberra, Australian Capital Territory, Australia – December 2019 – January 2020

See also
Asia-Pacific Scout Jamboree
U Ba Htay
U Tin Tun

References

External links
Scouting and Football in the South Pacific

!Asia-Pacific Region
Organizations based in Manila